John Kean (1756 – May 4, 1795) was an American merchant, banker and member of the Continental Congress from South Carolina who was the first in a long line of American politicians.

Early life
Kean was born in Charleston, South Carolina in 1756.  He was raised in Beaufort County, South Carolina by his mother, Jane Grove and stepfather, Captain Samuel Grove, a wealthy and successful merchant.

Career
Kean apprenticed with his stepfather's business partner, Peter Lavien, learning business and bookkeeping.  By the time of the American Revolutionary War, Kean was a prominent merchant in his home state of South Carolina.

During the War, he served as deputy paymaster of the South Carolina Militia under paymaster Daniel de Saussure.  Kean was taken prisoner during the Siege of Charleston in 1780 by General Sir Henry Clinton.  Kean was detained as a prisoner of war at sea, along with de Saussure's son, Henry William de Saussure, where Kean was confined aboard for several months leading to his development a respiratory disease.  Upon his release, Kean was appointed a member of the commission to audit accounts of the Revolutionary Army by General Washington.

Kean also served as a delegate for South Carolina in the Continental Congress from 1785 to 1787. Kean advocated ratification of the United States Constitution at South Carolina's ratifying convention. Kean compiled "actual enumerations" of the population of the 13 states for consideration at the Constitutional Convention in 1787, a precursor to the U.S. Census.

After General Washington became the first President of the United States, he appointed Kean cashier of the Bank of the United States in Philadelphia which he served at until his death.

Personal life
In 1789, Kean was married to Susan Livingston (1759–1853) of the prominent northern Livingston family.  Susan was the daughter of Peter Van Brugh Livingston, the New York State Treasurer, and Mary (née Alexander) Livingston. She was also the granddaughter of Philip Livingston, the 2nd Lord of Livingston Manor, and the niece of New Jersey's governor William Livingston, a signer of the Declaration of Independence and the U.S. Constitution. Together, they were the parents of one child:

 Peter Philip James Kean (1788–1828), who married Sarah Sabina Morris (1788–1878), a granddaughter of Lewis Morris.

Kean died at age 39 on May 4, 1795, in Philadelphia from the respiratory disease he developed during the Revolution.  He was interred in St. John’s Churchyard in Philadelphia.

Following his death his widow purchased a large estate known and home built by her governor uncle, known as Liberty Hall, which showcases the contributions of the Livingston and Kean families.  In 1800, his widow remarried to Count Julian Niemcewicz, a Polish nobleman who fled Poland after fighting unsuccessfully for Polish independence from Russia but returned in the wake of Napoleon's successful campaigns.

Descendants
His great-grandsons (named John Kean and Hamilton Fish Kean) both served as U.S. Senators for New Jersey. His great-grandnephew was US Representative Robert Winthrop Kean and his great-great-grandnephew is New Jersey Governor Thomas Kean.

References

External links

 

1756 births
1795 deaths
Continental Congressmen from South Carolina
18th-century American politicians
John
Burials at St. Peter's churchyard, Philadelphia